Cheungbeia robusta is a species of sea snail, a marine gastropod mollusk in the family Pseudomelatomidae, the turrids and allies

Description
The length of the shell attains 19 mm.

The whorls of the yellowish white shell are strongly turreted. The spire is exserted. The periphery is angulated and nodulous, with fine revolving striae. The large sinus is produced.

Distribution
This species occurs in the South China Sea..

References

 Hinds, R. B. "On new species of Pleurotoma, Clavatula, and Mangelia." Proceedings of the Zoological society of London. Vol. 11. 1843.
 Liu J.Y. [Ruiyu] (ed.). (2008). Checklist of marine biota of China seas. China Science Press. 1267 pp
 Leung KF. & Morton B. (2000). The 1998 resurvey of the subtidal molluscan community of the southeastern waters of Hong Kong, six years after dredging began and three since it ended.In: Proceedings of the Tenth International Marine Biological Workshop: Morton B, editor. The Marine Flora and Fauna of Hong Kong and Southern China. The marine flora and fauna of Hong Kong and southern China V. Hong Kong University Press, Hong Kong. pp 553–617.

External links
 

robusta
Gastropods described in 1843